The King's Church of England School is a mixed, Church of England, secondary school and sixth form located at Tettenhall,  north-west of Wolverhampton City Centre, in the West Midlands county of England, in the United Kingdom. It was originally formed as The Regis School in 1955 until 1998 when it changed its name to The King's Church of England School. It was extensively rebuilt/refurbished in 2012 and can now accommodate up to 900 pupils.

Facilities
The school's facilities include: Dance studio, drama studios, theatre, lecture theatre, fitness suite, sports hall, swimming pool, MUGA/tennis courts, cinder running track, faith centre and large playing fields.

Notable former pupils
 Denise Lewis  (born 27 August 1972, in West Bromwich, England), a retired British heptathlete
 Vikram Singh Solanki (born 1 April 1976), an Indian-born English cricket player

References

External links
The King's Church of England School official website

Secondary schools in Wolverhampton
Voluntary aided schools in England
Church of England secondary schools in the Diocese of Lichfield